The Democratic Generation Party or Hizb El-Geel al-Democrati is a political party in Egypt. The Democratic Generation Party can be considered a mainstream political party.

Overview
The party was founded in 2002. It was part of the Democratic Alliance for Egypt led by the Muslim Brotherhood during the 2011-2012 Egyptian parliamentary election.

See also 
 Liberalism in Egypt
 Contributions to liberal theory
 Liberalism worldwide
 List of liberal parties
 Liberal democracy

References

External links 
 Official Website of the Democratic Generation Party

Liberal parties in Egypt
Political parties established in 2002
2002 establishments in Egypt